Roger Roberts may refer to:

 Roger Roberts, Baron Roberts of Llandudno (born 1935), Welsh Liberal Democrat politician, Methodist minister, and life peer
 Roger Roberts (swimmer) (born 1948), competed in three events at the 1968 Summer Olympics